California Creek Missionary Baptist Church is a historic Baptist church located near Mars Hill, Madison County, North Carolina. It was built in 1917, and moved to its present location in 1937. It is a Gothic Revival style white frame church with Colonial Revival style decorative elements.  It has a cruciform plan and paired principal entrances in corner towers on the front facade.  A two-story, brick Sunday School annex was built in 1954. The church was sold to private owners in the late-1970s.

It was added to the National Register of Historic Places in 1984.

References

Baptist churches in North Carolina
Churches on the National Register of Historic Places in North Carolina
Gothic Revival church buildings in North Carolina
Neoclassical architecture in North Carolina
Churches completed in 1917
20th-century Baptist churches in the United States
Churches in Madison County, North Carolina
National Register of Historic Places in Madison County, North Carolina
Neoclassical church buildings in the United States